Rutidosoma is a genus of beetles belonging to the family Curculionidae.

The species of this genus are found in Europe and Northern America.

Species:
 Rutidosoma alexanderi Korotyaev, 2008 
 Rutidosoma caucasicum Korotyaev, 1989

References

Curculionidae
Curculionidae genera